The Rockrimmon Rockshelter is an archeological site in Stamford, Connecticut that was listed on the National Register of Historic Places in 1994. The site is significant as an early  Native American shelter and is centered on a boulder about 60 feet high that was used as the shelter. Native American tools and points were discovered at the site during excavations in 1975 and 1980.

The site is dated to the Middle and Late Archaic periods. In 1974, when there was a possibility that the site would be destroyed, members of the Norwalk Community College Archaeology Club undertook an investigation. Investigations ceased after the landowner said that he had decided not to destroy Rockrimmon Rock or its immediate surroundings if the land was developed.

See also
National Register of Historic Places listings in Stamford, Connecticut

References

Further reading 
 Wiegand, Ernest A. “The Rockrimmon Rockshelter (6-FA-116).” Bulletin of the Archaeological Society of Connecticut 42 (1980): 15–28.

National Register of Historic Places in Fairfield County, Connecticut
Archaeological sites on the National Register of Historic Places in Connecticut
History of Stamford, Connecticut
Rock shelters in the United States